Alyaksandr Dzemidovich (born 26 April 1989) is a Belarusian professional footballer.

His brother Vadzim Dzemidovich is also a professional footballer.

External links

1989 births
Living people
Belarusian footballers
Association football defenders
FC Dynamo Brest players
FC Granit Mikashevichi players
FC Lida players
FC Baranovichi players
FC Smorgon players
FC Neman Grodno players
FC Smolevichi players
FC Rukh Brest players
FC Volna Pinsk players
Sportspeople from Brest, Belarus